Events in the year 2010 in Burkina Faso.

Incumbents 

 President: Blaise Compaoré
 Prime Minister: Tertius Zongo

Events

February 
12 February – President Compaoré announces a plan to lift financial barriers to family planning to lower the maternal mortality rate within the country.

March 
31 March – UNITAR establishes a headquarters in the capital, Ouagadougou.

June 
25 June – The FAO and EU begin providing high quality seeds to Burkinabé farmers to combat food insecurity to at-risk regions.

July 
July-October – In floods throughout central and west Africa, 377 people die, including 16 in Burkina Faso.

November 
2 November – Burkina Faso, along with 7 other West African countries, sets plan to regulate cosmetics as part of an agreement between WAEMU member states.
5 November – Interpol rescues over 100 people in the country and arrests 11 individuals connected to a child trafficking operation.

Deaths

References 

 
2010s in Burkina Faso
Years of the 21st century in Burkina Faso
Burkina Faso 
Burkina Faso